Tillandsia magnusiana is a species of flowering plant in the genus Tillandsia. This species is native to southern and western Mexico (Jalisco, Veracruz, Guerrero, Oaxaca, Chiapas), El Salvador, Nicaragua and Honduras.

Cultivars
 Tillandsia 'Magic Blush'

References

magnusiana
Flora of Central America
Flora of Mexico
Plants described in 1889